Craig M. Scott (born March 14, 1962) is a Canadian politician and academic. Formerly a law professor at Osgoode Hall Law School and a director of the Jack and Mae Nathanson Centre on Transnational Human Rights, Crime and Security, he was elected as the New Democratic Party candidate in a federal by-election in Toronto—Danforth on March 19, 2012, following the death of Jack Layton in August 2011.

Background
Scott was born and raised in Windsor, Nova Scotia.  From 1979 to 1981, he attended Lester B. Pearson United World College of the Pacific in Canada, where he gained the International Baccalaureate Diploma. He then earned undergraduate degrees from McGill University and from the University of Oxford where he was a Rhodes Scholar at St John's College. He has a Bachelor of Laws from Dalhousie University and a Masters of Law from the London School of Economics. His academic specialty is international law  with a focus on human rights law. Scott was a professor in the University of Toronto Faculty of Law  from 1989 to 2001. He was Osgoode Law School's Associate Dean (Research and Graduate Studies)  from 2001 to 2004 and has remained on the faculty subsequently.

Scott and his partner Kovit Ratchadasri previously owned the Craig Scott Gallery, an art gallery on Berkeley Street near Toronto's Distillery District.

Advisor
Scott was an advisor to the African National Congress during its period in exile during the Apartheid era and subsequently assisted in the drafting of portions of the post-apartheid Constitution of South Africa. In 1993-1994, he served as co-counsel for the government of Bosnia and Herzegovina before the International Court of Justice and has also been involved in human rights issues relating to Iraq, Sri Lanka and Honduras where he was involved with the Truth Commission held in the aftermath of the 2009 Honduran coup d'état.

He also advised rights seeking groups in Canada in regards to legal challenges using the Charter of Rights and Freedoms and assisted Maher Arar in his lawsuit against the Canadian government.

Political career
Scott was selected as the New Democratic Party's candidate for the Toronto—Danforth by-election on January 9, 2012. He won the seat on March 19, 2012, winning 59% of the vote, despite a strong campaign by second-place Liberal finisher, Grant Gordon. Scott was defeated for re-election in 2015 by Liberal Julie Dabrusin amid the massive Liberal wave that swept through Toronto.

Electoral record

References

External links

 
 

1962 births
Living people
New Democratic Party MPs
Canadian human rights activists
People from Windsor, Nova Scotia
Politicians from Toronto
Gay politicians
Canadian LGBT Members of Parliament
Members of the House of Commons of Canada from Ontario
Lawyers in Ontario
Canadian legal scholars
Academic staff of York University
Academic staff of the University of Toronto Faculty of Law
Canadian Rhodes Scholars
McGill University alumni
Dalhousie University alumni
Alumni of St John's College, Oxford
Alumni of the London School of Economics
21st-century Canadian politicians
21st-century Canadian LGBT people
People educated at a United World College
Canadian gay men